A focus-plus-context screen is a specialized type of display device that consists of one or more high-resolution "focus" displays embedded into a larger low-resolution "context" display. Image content is displayed across all display regions, such that the scaling of the image is preserved, while its resolution varies across the display regions.

The original focus-plus-context screen prototype consisted of an 18"/45 cm LCD screen embedded in a 5'/150 cm front-projected screen. Alternative designs have been proposed that achieve the mixed-resolution effect by combining two or more projectors with different focal lengths 

While the high-resolution area of the original prototype was located at a fixed location, follow-up projects have obtained a movable focus area by using a Tablet PC.

Patrick Baudisch is the inventor of focus-plus-context screens (2000, while at Xerox PARC)

Advantages
 Allows users to leverage their foveal and their peripheral vision
 Cheaper to manufacture than a display that is high-resolution across the entire display surface
 Displays entirety and details of large images in a single view. Unlike approaches that combine entirety and details in software (fisheye views), focus-plus-context screens do not introduce distortion.

Disadvantages
 In existing implementations, the focus display is either fixed or moving it is physically demanding

References

Notes

 Yudhijit Bhattacharjee. In a Seamless Image, the Great and Small. In The New York Times, Thursday, March 14, 2002.

External links
 Focus-plus-context screens homepage

User interfaces
Computing output devices
Display technology
User interface techniques